Marc Fisher (born December 15, 1958) is a senior editor for The Washington Post, where he writes about national, foreign and local issues. He was previously a Post enterprise editor, leading a team of writers experimenting with new types of storytelling. Fisher wrote a local column for the Post and another about radio, music and culture titled "The Listener."

Early life and education
Fisher grew up in New York, attended the Horace Mann School and graduated with a Bachelor of Arts degree in history from Princeton University, where he was a member of the University Press Club.

Career
Fisher previously wrote the local column for the Post and was the paper's Special Reports Editor. He wrote about politics and culture for the Style section. He also served as the Central Europe bureau chief on the Post'''s foreign staff and earlier covered schools in Washington, D.C., and D.C. politics for the Metro section. Fisher was the Ferris Professor of Journalism at Princeton University, where he taught a course on The Journalism of Daily Life, served as journalist-in-residence at the American Institute for Contemporary German Studies at Johns Hopkins University, and was a visiting scholar at the George Washington University School of Media and Public Affairs. He worked at the Miami Herald from 1980 to 1986. Since then, he has worked at The Washington Post as a reporter, editor, and columnist. He was the Post's'' correspondent in Germany from 1989 to 1994.

Criticism 
On 26 May 2022, Fisher retweeted an article previously written by himself in 2018 after the Robb Elementary School shooting, in which he falsely claimed that the AR-15 was "Invented for Nazi infantrymen,further developed by the US military". Multiple Right-wing media outlets criticised Fisher for his lack of research,with Matt Vespa of Townhall calling it "The most embarrassing op-ed about gun rights and ownership".

Family
Fisher and his wife Jody Goodman have a son and daughter. The family resides in Washington.

Bibliography

References

External links

Booknotes interview with Fisher on After the Wall: Germany, The Germans, and the Burdens of History, August 6, 1995.

Living people
1958 births
20th-century American journalists
American male journalists
The New Yorker people
The Washington Post people